Christopher Thomas Knight (born December 7, 1965), also known as the North Pond Hermit, is a former recluse and burglar who lived without human contact (with two very brief exceptions) for 27 years between 1986 and 2013 in the North Pond area of Maine's Belgrade Lakes.

During his seclusion, Knight lived within a mile of summer cabins in a crude camp he built in a well-drained woodland obscured within a cluster of glacial erratic boulders. Having entered the woods with almost no possessions, he set up a camp composed entirely of items stolen from nearby cabins and camps. He survived by committing around 1,000 burglaries against houses in the area, at a rate of roughly 40 per year, to be able to survive during the harsh winters of Maine.

Apart from the fear and notoriety his many burglaries created in the local area, Knight's unusual life also attracted widespread international media reports upon his capture. Journalist Michael Finkel wrote an in-depth story about the incident for GQ, and later wrote a book titled The Stranger in the Woods: The Extraordinary Story of the Last True Hermit.

Life and seclusion

Christopher Thomas Knight graduated from Lawrence High School in Fairfield, Maine in 1984. Knight entered the woods in 1986 at 20 years of age, saying goodbye to no one. His parents never reported him missing to the police. In an interview, Knight said, "I had good parents", and, "We're not emotionally bleeding all over each other. We're not touchy-feely. Stoicism is expected." At the time of his notoriety,  neighbors who lived near Knight's childhood home reported that for 14 years, they had exchanged no more than a few words with Knight's mother.

Knight survived the bitterly cold Maine winters (with temperatures dipping as low as ) by waking up during the coldest part of the night and pacing his camp until warm. He regularly took cold sponge baths, shaved, and cut his hair, in part to avoid suspicion in the event he was spotted by others. He avoided building wood fires, whose smoke might reveal the location of his camp, but relied upon a propane camp stove to cook and melt snow for drinking and bathing. Stolen propane cylinders were transported in canoes borrowed from vacant camps. He quietly paddled along the shadowy shoreline in the predawn hours to avoid being silhouetted on open water. Knight concealed thefts by sprinkling pine needles over the canoes he had used when he returned them, presumably to make them appear to have been undisturbed. He stockpiled supplies to remain in his camp from November through March to avoid revealing his location by footprints on snow-covered ground.

Some have expressed doubt for Knight's outdoor survival skills, saying that Knight might have broken into and taken refuge in vacant cabins.

Encounters with others during seclusion

At the time of his arrest, Knight claimed only one instance occurred during his 27 years of solitude in which he spoke with another human; at some point in the 1990s, he exchanged the word "hi" with a hiker whom he encountered on a lightly traveled path.

In the summer of 2012, Knight broke into a cabin where a man was sleeping. There was no car in the driveway, so Knight thought it was empty. Without either one seeing each other, the man shouted "Get the hell out of here!", after which Knight ran out.

Biographer Michael Finkel later reported that around February 2013, a fisherman named Tony Bellavance (along with his son and grandson) had discovered Knight in his camp, two months before he was apprehended by police. Knight later admitted to having been discovered by the fishermen, but had not mentioned it to police at the time of his arrest because the group swore a pact to not tell anyone of their meeting (after the anglers learned that Knight simply wanted to be left alone).

Capture and aftermath

Knight was captured by game warden Sergeant Terry Hughes on April 4, 2013, while burgling the Pine Tree Camp in Rome, Maine. He was sentenced to seven months in jail on October 28, 2013, of which he had already served all but a week while awaiting sentencing. In addition to the jail sentence, Knight paid $2,000 in restitution to victims, completed a Co-Occurring Disorders Court Program (designed for people with substance abuse problems and mental health disorders), and completed three years of probation.

Knight has described deep-felt ethical misgivings about the burglaries committed, saying that stealing is wrong. Even the prosecutor said a longer sentence would have been cruel. Judge Nancy Mills believes that Knight was unlikely to reoffend. After release, Knight met with the judge every week, avoided alcohol, and secured a job with his brother.

Journalist Michael Finkel met with Knight for nine one-hour sessions while he was in jail. This was the genesis for first an article in GQ in August 2014, and then the book The Stranger In The Woods, published in March 2017.

Knight was largely reluctant to express any inkling of motives or insights gained through his experience, but he did offer, "solitude bestows an increase in something valuable... my perception. But... when I applied my increased perception to myself, I lost my identity. There was no audience, no one to perform for... To put it romantically, I was completely free." Finkel compared this observation to similar statements by Ralph Waldo Emerson, Charles de Foucauld, and Thomas Merton. Knight however resented being compared to Henry David Thoreau, instead calling him a dilettante because Thoreau only lived for two years in his Walden Pond cabin and his mother did his laundry, saying he was "...just a show-off who went out there and wrote a book saying 'Look how great I am.' " Knight now leads a quiet life in rural Maine.

See also

 Alexander Bichkov, lived alone in a Russian forest for nearly 20 years and was shot to death by police
 Ted Kaczynski, known as the Unabomber – lived as a hermit for 25 years in Montana
 Christopher McCandless, nomadic hitchhiker who starved to death in the Alaskan wilderness. Subject of Jon Krakauer's book Into the Wild (1996), later adapted into a 2007 film by Sean Penn
 Carl McCunn, wildlife photographer who became stranded in the Alaskan wilderness and eventually killed himself when he ran out of supplies (1981)
 Richard Proenneke, spent 30 years at Twin Lakes in the Alaskan wilderness
 Agafia Lykova, last survivor of the Lykov family who lived in the Russian wilderness starting in 1936, without contact to the outside world for 40 years.

References

External links
 The North Pond Hermit - Radio program with Michael Finkel

American hermits
Living people
1965 births
People from Maine
American people convicted of burglary
American nomads